Ross Friedman may refer to:

 Ross the Boss (Ross Friedman, born 1954), guitarist
 Ross Friedman (soccer) (born 1992), American soccer player